NA-143 Sahiwal-III is a constituency for the National Assembly of Pakistan.

Election 2002 

General elections were held on 10 Oct 2002. Sardar Farooq Ahmad Khan Laghari of National Alliance won by 39,312 votes.

Election 2008 

General elections were held on 18 Feb 2008. Malik Noman Ahmed Langrial of PML-Q won by 39,864 votes.

Election 2013 

General elections were held on 11 May 2013. Chaudhry Muhammad Munir Azhar of PML-N won by 89,126 votes and became the  member of National Assembly.

Election 2018

See also
NA-142 Sahiwal-II
NA-144 Khanewal-I

References

External links 
Election result's official website

NA-163